The following lists events that happened during 1952 in Réunion.

Events

March
 March 15–16 - 73 inches (1,870 mm) of rain falls in Cilaos, the most rainfall in one day up to that time.

References

 
1950s in Réunion
Years of the 20th century in Réunion
Reunion
Reunion
Reunion